Quintin "Quinn" Hughes (born October 14, 1999) is an American professional ice hockey defenseman and alternate captain for the Vancouver Canucks of the National Hockey League (NHL). Hughes was drafted seventh overall by the Canucks in the 2018 NHL Entry Draft. Prior to the draft, he was considered a top prospect player.

Following success with the USA Hockey National Team Development Program, Hughes joined the University of Michigan for the 2017–18 season. There he set a new record for most assists by a Michigan freshman defenseman and was named to the All-Big Ten Freshman Team and the All-Big Ten Second Team.

Internationally, Hughes has represented the United States at the 2018 World Junior Ice Hockey Championships and 2019 World Junior Ice Hockey Championships. He made his senior national debut for Team USA at the 2018 IIHF World Championship where he helped them win bronze.

Hughes is from a family of hockey players; his younger brother Jack was drafted 1st overall by the New Jersey Devils in the 2019 NHL Entry Draft, while his youngest brother Luke was drafted fourth overall in the 2021 NHL Entry Draft, also by the Devils. Their mother Ellen Weinberg-Hughes played for the United States women's national ice hockey team and his father is the director of player development for the Toronto Maple Leafs.

Playing career

Early career
Born in Orlando, Florida, Hughes began playing hockey while his family was living in Boston due to his father, Jim Hughes’ work. He began playing as a forward before transitioning to defense at the age of 13.

Hughes’ family moved to Toronto in 2006, as his father found work with the Toronto Maple Leafs. As he had begun skating at a young age, while in elementary school he was given permission to skate during lunch period after he consistently became distracted during class watching his younger brother and father skate on a frozen baseball diamond. Hughes' hockey career began when he played Bantam AAA and Minor Midget AAA hockey for the Toronto Marlboros, before joining the USA Hockey National Team Development Program (USNTDP) in 2015. He also had the option of joining the Ontario Hockey League (OHL), as the Sarnia Sting drafted him in the third round of the 2015 OHL Draft, but Hughes chose to continue developing in America. However, before joining the USNTDP, he made a verbal commitment in January 2015 to play NCAA hockey at the University of Michigan for their 2017–18 season.

Hughes played in the USNTDP alongside fellow top prospect Brady Tkachuk, with whom he also shared a room. In his first year with the U.S. National Under-17 Team, Hughes scored 7 goals and recorded 17 assists in 57 games. During the 2016–17 season, he scored four goals and 22 assists in 26 games, making him the first defenseman in USHL history to post such high points-per-game ratio two seasons before his NHL draft eligibility. For his efforts, he was named to the All-USHL Second Team. , he sits in fifth place for the USNTDP record for most points by a defenseman with 77.

Collegiate

Hughes played for the Michigan Wolverines at the University of Michigan from 2017 to 2019. There, he enrolled in the School of Kinesiology and majored in Sport Management. During his rookie season, in which he was the youngest NCAA male ice hockey player, Hughes recorded five goals and 24 assists in 37 games. His 29 points ranked tied for 12th in the NCAA and third in the Big Ten among freshmen, while his 24 assists ranked third in the NCAA and first overall in the Big Ten among freshman. Hughes' 24 assists is the most in Michigan program history by a freshman defenseman. Following an outstanding freshman season, Hughes was named to the Big Ten All-Freshman Team, and the All-Big Ten Second Team. He was also selected as a finalist for Big Ten Freshman of the Year, with the award eventually going to Mitchell Lewandowski.

Leading up to the 2018 NHL Entry Draft, Hughes was considered a top prospect player due to his skating and puck moving ability. The final ranking from the NHL Central Scouting Bureau in April placed Hughes in sixth place amongst North American skaters. He was eventually drafted by the Vancouver Canucks in the first round, seventh overall. He attended the Canucks development camp that summer but ultimately decided to return to Michigan for his sophomore year, citing a goal to win an NCAA championship and furthering his development as his reasons.

In spite of speculation Hughes would leave Michigan early to join the Canucks, he finished the 2018–19 season with the Wolverines. During the 2019 Big Ten Men's Ice Hockey Tournament, he suffered a foot injury in a 3–2 loss to the Minnesota Golden Gophers on March 8, 2019. After an x-ray showed limited damage to his foot, Hughes played the following night in a 4–1 loss to the Golden Gophers, which thus eliminated the Wolverines from the playoff series. During his sophomore season, Hughes recorded five goals and 28 assists in 32 games, ranking first on the Wolverines in scoring. Following an outstanding season, he was named to the All-Big Ten First Team and was nominated for the Hobey Baker Award. He was also named a finalist for Big Ten Player of the Year and Big Ten Defensive Player of the Year. On March 12, Hughes was named to the AHCA First-Team All-America, becoming the 95th All-American in Michigan's history.

Professional
On March 10, 2019, Hughes ended his collegiate career following his sophomore season, signing a three-year entry-level contract with the Canucks. After signing, Hughes underwent an MRI by the Canucks medical staff and was discouraged from skating for a week as a result of his foot injury sustained from the Big Ten playoffs. He eventually made his NHL debut on March 28, 2019, against the Los Angeles Kings where he played on a pairing with Luke Schenn. He recorded his first career NHL point, an assist on a Brock Boeser goal, in a 3–2 shootout win.

Hughes attended the Canucks training and preseason camp prior to the 2019–20 season. After the signing of Brock Boeser, Hughes was tested on the first unit of the powerplay alongside Boeser and J. T. Miller. After going scoreless to begin the season, Hughes recorded his first career NHL goal in their home opening game against the Los Angeles Kings while the Canucks were on a power play. He became the youngest Canuck defenseman since J. J. Daigneault to score a goal for the team. A month later, Hughes bruised his left knee in a game against the Anaheim Ducks on November 1, 2019. He returned to the lineup after missing one game, where he scored the game-tying goal in an eventual 2–1 overtime loss to the St. Louis Blues. As a result, he became the fourth under 20 Canucks player in franchise history to record 14 or more points by their 20th game. During a game on November 21, Hughes recorded three power play assists in the 6–3 win. This achievement made him the first rookie defenseman in NHL history to record three power play assists in multiple games in a season. By November 27, he became the first Canucks rookie defenseman to register three three-point games.  It also made him one of the first rookies of the 2019–20 season to reach 20 points. Due to his successful start to the season, Hughes was listed as a “Last Man standing” option at the 2020 NHL All-Star Game, allowing fans to vote him into the competition. On January 11, in a 6–3 win over the Buffalo Sabres, Hughes became the sixth fastest defensemen in NHL history to reach 30 assists in 49 games or less. That same day, he was voted into the NHL All-Star Game along with Mitch Marner, David Perron, and T. J. Oshie. As a result, the Vancouver Canucks became the first team in the Expansion Era to have a rookie play in the All-Star Game in three consecutive seasons. At the NHL All-Star Skills Competition, Hughes partook in the Fastest Skater contest, finishing with a time of 14.263. The next day, Hughes became the second rookie defenseman to score a goal in the NHL All-Star Game, during which Pacific Division coach Wayne Gretzky stated "That young lad's a defenseman? That's better hands than I had."

Upon returning from the All-Star break, Hughes continued his record breaking season with the Canucks. On February 27, he recorded an assist on J. T. Miller's power play goal against the Ottawa Senators, replacing Boeser as the franchise record holder for most powerplay points in a season by a rookie. As well, that assist was his 43rd of the season, moving him into first place for most single assists by a rookie in franchise history. He was subsequently named Rookie of the Month for February. Although the 2019–20 season was eventually paused due to the coronavirus, Hughes ended his rookie season as the lead rookie in points league-wide, becoming the third rookie defensemen since Bobby Orr and Brian Leetch to do so in the modern era. As a result of his play, he was named a Calder Memorial Trophy finalist alongside Cale Makar and Dominik Kubalík.

Hughes returned to the Canucks for their Return to Play Initiative months following the conclusion of the regular season, saying he felt "as strong as I've ever been." During the pause in play, he lived in Plymouth, Michigan with his family and played sports with his brothers everyday to remain in shape. He made his postseason debut during the teams qualifying round against the Minnesota Wild and recorded his first multi-point playoff game on August 6, 2020, as the Canucks took the lead in the series 2–1. As a result, he became the sixth youngest defenseman to record a three-assist playoff game and the youngest in team history. During the second round against the Vegas Golden Knights, Hughes set a new NHL record for most playoff assists by a rookie defensemen with 13 assists in 15 playoff games. After recording a goal and an assist during Game 6, he also surpassed the record for most points in a postseason by a rookie defenseman set by Cale Makar the night before. Following the Canucks elimination from the playoffs, Hughes was named to the All-Rookie Team, becoming the first Canucks defenseman since Mattias Öhlund in 1997–98 to be named on the team. Hughes would finish second in Calder Trophy voting to Cale Makar, becoming the third consecutive Canucks rookie to place in the top two for the award.

In the final year of his entry-level contract, Hughes was one of 22 players on the Canucks who were infected with an aggressive Brazil COVID-19 variant. He returned to the ice on April 21 in a 6–3 win over the Toronto Maple Leafs. Preliminary contract discussion also began for Hughes with centre Elias Pettersson. As contract discussions continued, Hughes missed most of training camp and pre-season games before signing a six-year, $47.1 million contract on October 1. He subsequently returned to the Canucks lineup on October 7 for a pre-season game against the Edmonton Oilers. He later became the second-fastest Canuck to reach the 100 assist milestone following a game against the Montreal Canadiens on November 29.

International play

Hughes has represented the United States internationally. He stated that choosing to play for the United States was an easy choice because it was important for him to represent his country.

In 2015, Hughes was named to the World U-17 Hockey Challenge for Team USA. He was one of seven players from the Toronto Marlboros Minor Midget Team to compete at this tournament, with all but Hughes representing Canada. Following that tournament, where Team USA failed to place, Hughes participated at the Under-17 Four Nations Tournament in Slovakia.

In 2017, Hughes played at the 2017 IIHF World U18 Championships, helping the U.S. Under-18 World Championship team win a gold medal in Slovakia. He finished in the top five in scoring among United States defensemen with five points. He was later named to the U20 U.S. national junior team to compete at the 2018 World Junior Ice Hockey Championships in Buffalo, New York, helping his team win bronze.

A few months later, following the conclusion of his freshman season at Michigan, he was the youngest player named to the senior United States roster to compete at the 2018 IIHF World Championship. At the age of 18, he was the only collegiate player on the roster and became the 33rd Michigan Wolverine player to compete at an IIHF World Championship tournament. Hughes again won bronze with Team USA, scoring two points in ten games while averaging 12:13 minutes of ice time.

During his sophomore season at Michigan, Hughes was selected to compete at the 2019 World Junior Ice Hockey Championships, alongside his brother Jack. They became only the third pair of brothers to compete for Team USA at a World Juniors tournament, with the most recent pairing being Joey and Michael Anderson in 2017. On December 24, 2018, Hughes, along with Michigan teammate Josh Norris, were named alternate captains for Team USA. The two players were two of five returning competitors from the 2018 World Junior Championships team. Hughes helped lead Team USA to the gold medal round of the tournament where they lost 3–2 against Finland.

After the Vancouver Canucks season ended, Hughes was one of 17 players named to Team USA for the 2019 IIHF World Championship.

Player profile

Described as a smooth-skating and mobile player, Hughes says he models his game after NHL defensemen Duncan Keith and Kris Letang. After being drafted by the Canucks, general manager Jim Benning cited his dynamic skating and ability to quickly transition the puck as reasons for drafting him, seeing it as ideal for the team. Andrew Berkshire of Sportsnet described Hughes as one of the best young defensemen in the NHL.

Personal life
Hughes was born in Orlando, Florida while his father was an assistant coach for the Orlando Solar Bears. His mother is Jewish  while his father is Catholic. He comes from a hockey-playing family as his father, Jim Hughes, is a former hockey player and team captain for Providence College, an assistant coach for the Boston Bruins, and the Toronto Maple Leafs Director of Player Development. His mother, Ellen Weinberg-Hughes, played ice hockey, lacrosse, and soccer at the University of New Hampshire and, in 2012, was inducted into the University of New Hampshire Athletics Hall of Fame. She also played for the United States women's national ice hockey team, and won a silver medal at the 1992 World Championship. Hughes has two younger brothers, Jack and Luke, who also play hockey and were drafted by the New Jersey Devils. Jack was drafted first overall in the 2019 NHL Entry Draft and Luke was drafted 4th overall by the Devils in the 2021 NHL Entry Draft.

His uncle Marty and his cousin, Teddy Doherty, were also both involved in hockey. Marty last played in the British National League for the Dundee Stars, and Teddy last played for the Manchester Monarchs in the ECHL.

Career statistics

Regular season and playoffs

International

Awards and honors

See also
List of select Jewish ice hockey players

References

External links
 

1999 births
Living people
21st-century American Jews
AHCA Division I men's ice hockey All-Americans
American expatriate ice hockey players in Canada
American men's ice hockey defensemen
Ice hockey people from Florida
Jewish American sportspeople
Jewish ice hockey players
Michigan Wolverines men's ice hockey players
National Hockey League first-round draft picks
Sportspeople from Orlando, Florida
University of Michigan School of Kinesiology alumni
USA Hockey National Team Development Program players
Vancouver Canucks draft picks
Vancouver Canucks players